"Send Her My Love" is a 1983 song by the American rock band Journey. Released in September of that year as the fourth single from their album Frontiers, this Cain/Perry-penned ballad went to number 23 on the U.S. pop charts in November of the same year.

Chart history

Personnel
Steve Perry - lead vocals
Neal Schon - guitar, vocals
Ross Valory - bass, vocals
Jonathan Cain - keyboards, vocals 
Steve Smith - drums, percussion

References

1982 songs
1983 singles
Journey (band) songs
Songs written by Steve Perry
Songs written by Jonathan Cain
Rock ballads
Pop ballads
Song recordings produced by Mike Stone (record producer)
Columbia Records singles